USS Maartensdijk (ID-2497) was a freighter seized by U.S. Customs when the United States declared war against Germany in World War I. Maartensdijk – a Dutch-owned vessel—was used by the Navy to transport military cargo across the Atlantic Ocean in support of Allied troops in Europe.

Seized by U.S. Customs 

Maartensdijk, a steel cargo steamer, was built as Rapallo by Furness Withy & Co., Ltd., West Hartlepool, England, in 1902. Prior to World War I, she sailed the Atlantic sealanes and in 1918 was owned by Holland-American Line, Rotterdam, Netherlands. Maartensdijk was seized by U.S. Customs at New York City 20 March 1918; turned over to the Navy 21 March; and commissioned 28 March for duty with NOTS.

World War I service 
 
After loading Army cargo, Maartensdijk departed in convoy for European waters 10 April. Steaming via Halifax, Nova Scotia, she reached St. Nazaire, France, 14 May, discharged her cargo, and sailed for the United States 15 June. During the closing months of World War I she made two more cargo runs out of New York and Boston, Massachusetts, to French ports.

Post-war service 

She returned to New York City 2 days after the signing of the Armistice. Sailing from Boston 12 December, she carried additional cargo to French ports and returned Army supplies to the United States. In all, she transported more than 27,000 tons of supplies during her four cargo runs to France.

Post-war decommissioning 

Maartensdijk returned to New York City 9 February 1919. She decommissioned there 25 February 1919; transferred to the U.S. Shipping Board the same day; and subsequently was returned to her owner, Holland American Line.

References
  
 Maartensdijk (Dutch Freighter, 1902); Later USS Maartensdijk (ID # 2497), 1918-1919

World War I auxiliary ships of the United States
Transports of the United States Navy
Cargo ships of the United States Navy
Ships built on the River Tees
1902 ships